Tim Sperrevik (born 2 March 1976 in Norway) is a Norwegian retired footballer. He used to work making boats.

England
Taken to Hartlepool United on trial after the Pools 2000/01 Norway camp, Sperrevik impressed coach Chris Turner, who eventually presented him with a two-year contract despite being unfit and slightly corpulent upon arrival. Debuting at Exeter City on the 26th of August, the Norwegian missed Hartlepool's November trip to Scunthorpe United through suspension, posting 14 appearances total before returning to Fana on loan. However, he did not see out the remainder of his contract so that he could stay in Norway.

Asked about the standard of English football, Sperrevik replied that it was more faster and physical.

References

External links 
 Norges Fotballforbund Profile 
 Soccerbase Profile 
 Bundesliga.at Profile 
 POOLStats Profile

Florø SK players
Fana IL players
SW Bregenz players
Association football forwards
Norwegian football managers
Expatriate footballers in Austria
Expatriate footballers in England
Norwegian expatriate sportspeople in Austria
Norwegian expatriate sportspeople in England
Norwegian expatriate footballers
Hartlepool United F.C. players
Norwegian footballers
1976 births
Living people